WNCU (90.7 FM) is a radio station broadcasting a Jazz format. Licensed to Durham, North Carolina, United States, the station serves the Raleigh area. The station is currently owned by North Carolina Central University and features programming from National Public Radio and Public Radio International.

WNCU broadcasts in the HD radio format.

See also
 List of jazz radio stations in the United States
 List of community radio stations in the United States

References

External links

NCU
North Carolina Central University
NCU
WNCU
NPR member stations
Radio stations established in 1995
Community radio stations in the United States